This list of Northumbrian saints includes Christian saints with strong connections to the medieval Kingdom of Northumbria, either because they were of local origin and ethnicity (chiefly Anglian) or because they travelled to Northumbria from their own homeland and became noted in their hagiography for work there. Northumbria existed from the 7th–10th centuries in what is now northern England, along with areas of the Scottish Borders and the Lothian. Its chief ecclesiastical centre was York.

During the reign of king Oswald of Northumbria, an Irish monk Aidan was invited to reconvert the area to Christianity. He and other Irish monks achieved this and subsequently the Northumbrians helped to reconvert much of the rest of England and also parts of the European continent.

Saints

See also
 List of Anglo-Saxon saints
 List of Welsh saints
 List of Cornish saints
 List of Irish saints
 List of saints of the Canary Islands

Footnotes

Northumbria
 
Saints
Saints